Varner can refer to:

People
Buck Varner (1930–2000), baseball player
Elise Varner (1926-2021), American political hostess and activist
Geoffry Varner (born 1987), American figure skater
Harold Varner III (born 1990), American golfer
Harry Varner  (1885–1970), American college football coach
Jamie Varner (born 1984), mixed martial artist
Jeff Varner (born 1966), American news anchor, reporter, and show contestant
Margaret Varner Bloss (born 1927), American athlete and academic
Martin Varner (1785–1844), American settler in Mexican Texas
Nick Varner (born 1948), American pool player
Robert Edward Varner (1921–2006), American federal judge
Tanner Varner (born 1984), American football player
Tom Varner (born 1957), American jazz French horn player and composer
Willie Varner (1926–2009), high school football coach

Places and organizations
Varner, Kansas
Varner, West Virginia
Varner-Gruppen, Norwegian textile retailer
Varner–Hogg Plantation State Historical Site, home of former Governor of Texas James S. Hogg
Bell-Varner House, historic home in Leitersburg, Maryland
Varner's Station, former name for Smyrna, Georgia